Oliver Edward Mitchell (April 8, 1927 – May 11, 2013) was an American musician and bandleader. He was the son of Harold Mitchell, lead trumpeter for MGM Studios, who also taught Ollie to play the trumpet.

Career
Mitchell would go on to play in big bands for Harry James, Buddy Rich and Pérez Prado, among others, as well as the NBC Symphony Orchestra. In the 1960s, Mitchell joined The Wrecking Crew, a group of studio and session musicians who played anonymously on many records for popular singers of the time, as well as television theme songs, film scores, and advertising jingles. Mitchell was also an original member of Herb Alpert's Tijuana Brass. He would go on to have his own bands—Ollie Mitchell's Sunday Band, and the Olliephonic Horns.

Personal life
In 1995, Mitchell and his wife Nancy moved from Los Angeles to Puako, Hawaii, where he founded the Horns. In 2010, Mitchell published his memoir, Lost, But Making Good Time: A View from the Back Row of the Band. According to his wife, he stopped playing the trumpet toward the end of his life, due to macular degeneration and hand problems from an automobile accident. Mitchell also suffered from cancer and died on May 11, 2013. He was survived by his wife and four children.

Discography

With Chet Baker
Blood, Chet and Tears (Verve, 1970)
With Harry James
The New James (Capitol Records – ST 1037, 1958)
Harry's Choice (Capitol Records – ST 1093, 1958)
With Stan Kenton 
Stan Kenton Conducts the Los Angeles Neophonic Orchestra (Capitol, 1965)
Hair (Capitol, 1969)
With Irene Kral
Wonderful Life (Mainstream, 1965)
With Shorty Rogers
Chances Are It Swings (RCA Victor, 1958)
The Wizard of Oz and Other Harold Arlen Songs (RCA Victor, 1959)
Shorty Rogers Meets Tarzan (MGM, 1960)
An Invisible Orchard (RCA Victor, 1961 [1997])
Bossa Nova (Reprise, 1962)
Jazz Waltz (Reprise, 1962)
With Pete Rugolo
Rugolo Plays Kenton (EmArcy, 1958)
The Music from Richard Diamond (EmArcy, 1959)
Behind Brigitte Bardot (Warner Bros., 1960)
The Original Music of Thriller (Time, 1961)
Ten Trumpets and 2 Guitars (Mercury, 1961)
With Dan Terry
The Complete Vita Recordings of Dan Terry (Vita Records, 1952)
With Gerald WilsonCalifornia Soul'' (Pacific Jazz, 1968)

Bibliography

See also
 List of trumpeters

References

External links

1927 births
2013 deaths
American bandleaders
American trumpeters
American male trumpeters